Kango is a Bantu language spoken in the Bas-Uele District of the Democratic Republic of the Congo. It may be a cover term for various dialects spoken by fishermen in the area.

References

Bwa languages
Languages of the Democratic Republic of the Congo